Ragsdale may refer to :

Ragsdale (surname)
Ragsdale High School, a public high school in Jamestown, North Carolina
Ragsdale, Indiana, an unincorporated community in Knox County

See also
Ragsdale conjecture, a mathematical conjecture